Zoliswa Albertina Kota-Mpeko, sometimes known as Zoe Kota-Fredericks, is a Member of Parliament (MP) for the African National Congress.

She is the Deputy Minister of Human Settlements and has been a Member of the National Assembly since 1994.

References 

Living people
African National Congress politicians
Members of the National Assembly of South Africa
20th-century South African women politicians
20th-century South African politicians
21st-century South African women politicians
21st-century South African politicians
Women members of the National Assembly of South Africa
Year of birth missing (living people)